Zhané was an American R&B duo, best known for their 1993 hit "Hey Mr. D.J.", which reached No. 6 on the U.S. Billboard Hot 100. Other popular hits include "Groove Thang" (U.S. No. 17) and minor hit "Sending My Love", both released in 1994. The group was part of Queen Latifah's Flavor Unit collective.

Biography

Beginnings
Renée Neufville and Jean Norris initially met in the early 1990s, while both were attending Philadelphia's Temple University; they would sing together at talent shows and other events.  In her youth, Norris' father, Dennis, was a pastor at the Second Baptist Church in Moorestown, New Jersey, and Norris herself was a member of the choir. Although they were not yet a group, Neufville and Norris collaborated on each other's songs. In 1991, the pair met DJ Jazzy Jeff and did their first professional recording together, "Ring My Bell", which was on the same album that featured DJ Jazzy Jeff & The Fresh Prince's popular hit "Summertime".  Former Warner Bros. executive Benny Medina suggested they become a group. For the name, Neufville had the idea of using the French pronunciation of their first names Jean and Renée, which sounded like "Jahnay". According to Norris "We added a 'Z' for a little flavor and we came up with Zhané." The twist they gave their name is similar to naming patterns that have been used all around the world, especially in Black communities.

Breakthrough & Pronounced Jah-Nay
Given a high-profile spot on the all-star compilation  Roll Wit Tha Flava as their first recording opportunity, Zhané came away with one of the hip-hop party anthems of all time, "Hey, Mr. D.J." After meeting Naughty by Nature member Kay Gee, Zhané (then credited as Jhané) impressed the producer enough to go right into the studio to record for Roll Wit tha Flava. When "Hey, Mr. D.J." was released as a separate single as well, it hit number six on the pop charts and earned the group a contract with Motown in 1994. Their debut album, Pronounced Jah-Nay, produced two further Top 40 hits ("Groove Thang," "Sending My Love") and went gold by the end of the year; it achieved platinum status two years later. Zhané kept busy during 1995–1996 with spots on tracks by Busta Rhymes and De La Soul as well as new songs of their own on the NFL Jams and NBA 50th Anniversary compilations and the soundtracks to Higher Learning and A Low Down Dirty Shame — the latter, "Shame," became their fourth Top 40 hit. After the success of their debut album Pronounced Jah-Nay, the duo appeared with TLC, SWV, Jade, En Vogue and others on the single "Freedom (Theme from Panther)" from the soundtrack to the 1995 Mario Van Peebles film Panther.

Saturday Night
Norris and Neufville released the follow-up album Saturday Night in 1997, co-produced by Kay Gee, Eddie F., and themselves. The release featured the hit single "Request Line." A remix with different lyrics and raps by Queen Latifah followed. It peaked just outside the Top 40.

Group dissolution and solo projects
Since the group's dissolution, Jean Norris married musician Marcus Baylor, perhaps best known as the drummer in jazz fusion ensemble, the Yellowjackets from 2000 to 2010. Jean Baylor released the solo album Testimony: My Life in 2007 and a contemporary Christmas album entitled Light Up the World in November 2011. She later formed an R&B/jazz duo with her husband named The Baylor Project and they released their debut album The Baylor Project (The Journey) in February 2017. In November 2017, the duo received two 60th Grammy Awards-nominations under Best Jazz Vocal Album and Best Traditional R&B Performance.

Neufville hosted an early live internet series called 88 Soul where guests included well-known R&B/Neo-Soul artists such as Jill Scott, Carl Thomas, Kelis, and Joe. She later contributed to albums and videos by the likes of India.Arie, Will Downing, Heather Headley, Leela James and Aaliyah amongst others. She became involved in Roy Hargrove's RH Factor project and figured prominently on the 2006 release Distractions playing keyboards and contributing lead vocals.

Discography

Studio albums

Singles

 Note
Did not chart on the Hot R&B/Hip-Hop Songs chart (Billboard rules at the time prevented album cuts from charting). Chart peak listed represents the Hot R&B/Hip-Hop Airplay chart.

Featured singles

References

External links

 Renee Neufville's MySpace page
 Jean Baylor's MySpace page (formerly Jean Norris)
 Jean Baylor Official Site
 T-Mad's Music Interviews Jean Baylor Link 1 Link 2

American musical duos
African-American musical groups
American contemporary R&B musical groups
American girl groups
Contemporary R&B duos
Motown artists
Female musical duos